James Rebanks (born 1974) is an English sheep farmer and author, from Matterdale in Cumbria. His first book, The Shepherd's Life, was published in 2015, and he published English Pastoral  in 2020. He also published The Illustrated Herdwick Shepherd in 2015 and The Shepherd's View: Modern Photographs from an Ancient Landscape in 2016.

Early life and education
Rebanks left school at the age of 16 to work on his family's farm with two GCSEs in woodworking and religious studies. He took A levels at evening classes in Carlisle before studying at Magdalen College, Oxford, where he achieved a double first in history.

Career
Following his degree, Rebanks returned to farming, which he continues to do, specialising in Herdwick sheep but moving towards a more mixed farm. He has also run a consultancy based at his farm. He was involved in the bid for the Lake District to receive World Heritage status (which was approved by UNESCO in 2017), and  had a following of 141,667 on Twitter as "Herdwick Shepherd" (@herdyshepherd1).

In 2018 he resigned from a government panel set up by Secretary of State for Environment, Food and Rural Affairs Michael Gove, and also took a break from Twitter after the composition of the panel was criticised by environmentalists as being biased towards the farming community. 

In 2019 he appeared on BBC Radio 4's Desert Island Discs. His chosen music included tracks by Rachmaninoff, Nina Simone, and Kirsty MacColl (the choice he would rescue from the waves); his chosen book was The Old Man and the Sea by Ernest Hemingway, and his luxury was pen and paper. He has also appeared on BBC Radio 3's Private Passions and Radio 4's On Your Farm. In December 2021 he guest-edited Radio 4's Today programme.

In 2021 English Pastoral won the Wainwright Prize in the Nature Writing category.

Selected publications
 
 
 
 (published in North America as Pastoral Song: A Farmer’s Journey. 3 August 2021. Custom House. )

References

External links
 @herdyshepherd1 (official Twitter account)

Shepherds
21st-century English farmers
Agricultural writers
English nature writers
English memoirists
English non-fiction writers
21st-century British non-fiction writers
Alumni of Magdalen College, Oxford
People from Matterdale
1974 births
Living people